Jay McAuley (born August 7, 1983) is a former American basketball player and coach. He was the head coach of the Wofford Terriers men's basketball team.

Playing career
McAuley played basketball at Georgia where he appeared in 46 games. He was part of the Bulldogs 2008 SEC men's basketball tournament championship squad and its 2008 NCAA tournament team.

Coaching career
After working as a student manager at his alma mater once his playing career wrapped up, McAuley joined Mike Young's staff at Wofford for his first assistant coaching position. From there, he'd move on to an assistant coaching spot at Gardner-Webb for a three-year stretch before landing at Furman as assistant coach from 2013 to 2017. McAuley would rejoin Wofford's staff in 2017, and was part of the staff that won both the Southern Conference regular season and tournament championship earning a seven-seed in the 2019 NCAA tournament where the Terriers advanced to the round of 32.

On April 14, 2019, McAuley was promoted to head coach of the Terriers following the departure of Young who accepted the head coaching position at Virginia Tech. On December 30, 2022, McAuley resigned his coaching position following a month-long leave of absence.

Head coaching record

References

1983 births
Living people
American men's basketball coaches
American men's basketball players
Basketball coaches from Georgia (U.S. state)
Basketball players from Marietta, Georgia
College men's basketball head coaches in the United States
Furman Paladins men's basketball coaches
Gardner–Webb Runnin' Bulldogs men's basketball coaches
Georgia Bulldogs basketball players
Wofford Terriers men's basketball coaches